This is a list of acts of the Parliament of South Africa enacted in the years 1910 to 1919.

South African acts are uniquely identified by the year of passage and an act number within that year. Some acts have gone by more than one short title in the course of their existence; in such cases each title is listed with the years in which it applied.

The National Archives of the United Kingdom hold copies of the Acts from 1910 - 1925 in TNA Catalogue ref: CO 632. Correspondence relating to the Acts can also be found in the Original Correspondence, TNA Catalogue ref: CO 551.

The South Africa Act, 1909, which created the Union of South Africa, is often listed with the acts of the Parliament of South Africa although it was enacted by the Parliament of the United Kingdom.

1910

1911

1912

1913

1914

1914 Special Session

1915

1916

1917

1918

1919

References
 Government Gazette of the Union of South Africa, Volumes III–XXXVII.
 

1910